Danyel Robinson (born September 14, 1971), better known by his stage name Dru Down, is an American rapper and actor from Oakland, California. He is currently a member of The Regime, a collective of rappers that includes Yukmouth, Tech N9ne, Messy Marv, BG Bulletwound, Dorasel, Grant Rice, and Tha Realest.

Early life
Danyel Robinson grew up in East Oakland, California, raised by his grandmother and step-father after having lost his mother at the age of three. In his early teens, Robinson discovered from his grandmother that his biological father was bassist and singer Bootsy Collins, Collins having met his mother at a show.

Music career

Early career, Fools from the Streets, Explicit Game and "Pimp of the Year" 
Robinson began developing an interest in rap music in the late 1980s, and eventually began recording his own songs as Dru Down, releasing his debut album Fools from the Streets in 1993 to moderate success in the Bay Area. The local success of his album led to him being signed to Relativity Records, a Sony Music imprint to release his second album Explicit Game in 1994. The album spawned Dru Down's most successful single to date, "Pimp of the Year", which peaked at number 65 on the Billboard Hot 100. The single stayed on Billboard for 24 weeks.

1996–2001: Can You Feel Me, acting and Pimpin' Phernelia 
Dru Down's third album, Can You Feel Me, was released in 1996, and spawned a single of the same name that was a minor but commercial hit. It also featured Dru Down's first collaboration with his father, Bootsy Collins, which was followed by a guest appearance on Collins' album Fresh Outta 'P' University. One of the album's songs, Mista Busta addresses Dru Down's then-ongoing feud with fellow Bay Area rapper Too Short, and serves as a diss track towards Too Short. The album peaked at #54 on the Billboard 200, and was critically praised, receiving a 4/5 star rating from Allmusic. That same year, Dru Down began his acting career, appearing in the movie Original Gangstas as Kayo. He also appeared on the 2Pac song "All About You" from 2Pac's fourth studio album All Eyez on Me, where he performs the intro.

In 2001, he signed with Ruthless Records, but did not release any albums, instead releasing his fourth and fifth studio albums through American Recordings and C-Note Records, respectively.

2001–present: Chronicles of a Pimp and The Regime 
Currently, Dru Down is signed to rapper Yukmouth's Smoke-A-Lot Records and owns his own record label, Pimp On Records, where he released his 2010 album Chronicles of a Pimp. He also serves as a member of the hip-hop collective The Regime, a group led by Yukmouth. The group released their debut album, Dragon Gang in 2013.

Legal issues
In 2013, Dru Down was sentenced to three years in the Santa Rita jail for driving under the influence and evading police, a violation of his probation for a prior driving offence. He was featured on an episode of Lockup on MSNBC.

Discography

Studio albums
 Fools From the Streets (1993)
 Explicit Game (1994)
 Can You Feel Me (1996)
 Pimpin' Phernelia (2001)
 Gangsta Pimpin''' (2002)
 Chronicles of a Pimp (2010)
 GP No PC Lock Up (2018)
 Welcome 2 Dru’s World (2019)

Collaboration albums
 Cash Me Out with Lee Majors (2006)
 Dragon Gang with The Regime (2013)

Compilation albums
 Dru Down's Greatest Hits (2006)
 Lost Tapes I (2008)
 Lost Tapes II (2008)
 Lost Tapes III (2008)
 Lost Tapes IV (2008)

Mixtapes
 Crack Muzic Vol. 1 with Rahmean & Lee Majors (2007)
 Crack Muzic Vol. 2 with Rahmean & Lee Majors (2007)
 New Crack City with Rahmean & Lee Majors (2009)

Singles
"Pimp of the Year" (1994)
 "Ice Cream Man" (featuring Luniz) (1994)
 "No One Loves You" (1995)
 "Can You Feel Me" (1996)
 "Baby Bubba" (featuring Bootsy Collins) (1997)
 "Hello" (featuring The Jacka) (2010)

Guest appearances

Filmography
 1996 Original Gangstas'' as 'Kayo'

References

External links
Archive Official website from the original

African-American male rappers
Rappers from Oakland, California
Living people
1973 births
Gangsta rappers
21st-century American rappers
21st-century American male musicians
21st-century African-American musicians
20th-century African-American people